HBF is Australia's fifth biggest private health insurance provider with a national market share of 7.82%. HBF is headquartered in Western Australia, however, 18.6% of HBF members are outside of WA and are residents of Victoria, New South Wales, Queensland, South Australia, Tasmania, Northern Territory and the Australian Capital Territory.

History
In 1941, HBF was established as the Metropolitan Hospitals Benefit Fund of Western Australia, with the core purpose of providing affordable health services to Western Australians.
HBF's purpose can be directly traced back to its origins as a key provider of social services prior to the introduction of universal government health cover in Medicare. It was established to provide a pool of funds to ensure the ongoing provision of affordable health services for members. Since its inception, HBF has grown to become the leading provider of health insurance in Western Australia.

In 2009, HBF had 7.7% of the national market share for private health insurance.

HBF offers health insurance for hospital, ancillary, urgent ambulance and cover for complementary therapies.  

In 2021, HBF completed the acquisition of Brisbane-based CUA Health Pty Ltd. As of 2021, this increased the company's market share to approximately 8%, with 17% of members living outside of Western Australia.

Locations
HBF has 18 branches located throughout Western Australia:
 Albany
 Belmont
 Booragoon
 Bunbury
 Cannington
 Clarkson
 Geraldton
 Innaloo
 Joondalup
 Kalgoorlie
 Karrinyup
 Mandurah
 Midland
 Morley
 Perth
 Rockingham
 Success

References

External links
 HBF website
 Prudential and Reporting Standards for Private health insurance

Insurance companies of Australia
Companies based in Perth, Western Australia
Financial services companies established in 1941
Health insurance in Australia
1941 establishments in Australia